Zangi Kola-ye Olya (also Romanized as Zangī Kolā-ye ‘Olyā; also known as Zangī Kolā-ye Bālā) is a village in Dabuy-ye Shomali Rural District, Sorkhrud District, Mahmudabad County, Mazandaran Province, Iran. At the 2006 census, its population was 1,336, in 357 families.

References 

Populated places in Mahmudabad County